Stenocereus gummosus is a  flowering plant in the family Cactaceae that is found in Baja California, Mexico at elevations of 9 to 134 meters

References

External links
 
 

gummosus
Flora of Mexico